Motherwell Football Club is a Scottish football club based in the town of Motherwell, North Lanarkshire. The club first competed in a European competition in 1991–92, qualifying for the European Cup Winners' Cup as winners of the 1991 Scottish Cup. The club have reached the play-off round of the Europa League twice (2010 and 2012), which remains the club's joint best run in a European competition.

History

1990s
Motherwell qualified for a UEFA competition for the first time in 1991–92 after winning the Scottish Cup the previous season. Their opponents were GKS Katowice from Poland. They won the home leg 3–1, but lost the away tie 2–0, resulting in elimination on away goals.

Motherwell qualified for the UEFA Cup for the first time in 1994–95 having finished third in the 1993–94 Scottish Premier Division the previous season. They faced HB Torshavn of the Faroe Islands in the preliminary round, and advanced to the next round winning by an aggregate score of 7-1 after a 3–0 home leg win. In the first round proper, they faced German giants Borussia Dortmund. They lost the first leg away 1-0 and lost the home second leg 2–0, losing 3–0 on aggregate. Motherwell finished second behind Rangers in the 1994–95 Scottish Premier Division, leading to qualification for the preliminary round of the UEFA Cup. They faced MYPA of Finland, but lost the first leg 3–1 at home. A 2–0 away win was not enough for Motherwell to advance and they were eliminated on the away goals rule.

2008–15
After a 13-year absence, Motherwell returned to European football by finishing third in the 2007-08 Scottish Premier League. They were drawn to face Nancy of France in the first round proper. After losing the first leg 1–0 at the Stade Marcel Picot, they then lost the second leg 2–0 at home, losing 3–0 on aggregate. Motherwell qualified for Europe for a second straight season after winning a place through the Fair Play League, despite finishing 7th the previous season. They were the first ever Scottish entrant to the newly formed Europa League. Also, due to extensive remedial work on their Fir Park surface, Motherwell played all of their home European matches at Excelsior Stadium in Airdrie. They were drawn to face Welsh Premier League side Llanelli in the first qualifying round. They suffered a shock 1–0 home first leg defeat, but recovered to win the away leg 3–0 at the Parc y Scarlets. In the next round they met Flamurtari of Albania, but lost the first leg 1–0 away. Just like in the previous round, they recovered by hammering the Albanians 8–1 at home in the second, a score that stands as a record club European victory to this day. They advanced to the third qualifying round for a meeting with Romanian heavyweights Steaua București. They lost the first leg 3–0 away at the Stadionul Steaua, and the second leg 3–1 at home. and were eliminated 6–1 on aggregate.

A fifth-place finish in the 2010-11 Scottish Premier League saw Motherwell qualify for Europe for a third straight season. They were to play only Scandinavian opponents during that season's run. They first played Icelandic club Breiðablik in the second qualifying round, winning both legs 1–0 to advance to the third qualifying round. They would then be paired with Aalesunds of Norway, and drew the first leg away 1-1, their only draw in European football, before winning the second leg 3–0 at Fir Park. They were in the Europa League play-offs, the furthest they have gone in European competition, and would play Danish outfit Odense. They lost the first leg away 2–1, and lost the home second leg 1–0 to  bow out of Europe for another season.

Motherwell qualified for the Champions League for the first time in 2012, being placed in the third qualifying round. They took the place of Rangers who were in administration and were not allowed to participate. Motherwell were in the non-champions section of the draw, and were paired with Greek giants Panathinaikos. They lost the first leg 2–0 at Fir Park, and went on to lose the second leg 3–0 at the Olympic Stadium in Athens. Motherwell's elimination from the Champions League saw them parachuted into the Europa League play-off round, where they would face Levante of Spain. After losing the home leg 2–0, they then lost the second leg 1–0 away in Valencia to bow out of Europe 3–0 on aggregate and without scoring a single goal overall. They did, however, equal their longest participation in European competition.

Motherwell finished the 2012-13 Scottish Premier League in second place, and with champions Celtic winning the 2012-13 Scottish Cup, Motherwell moved into the third qualifying round of the Europa League. They were un-seeded in that draw and were paired with Kuban Krasnodar of Russia. They lost the first-leg 2–0 at Fir Park, suffering a 1–0 defeat in the return leg to exit European competition. Motherwell finished the 2013-14 Scottish Premiership in second place, meaning Motherwell began in the second qualifying round of the Europa League. They were seeded in that draw and were paired with Stjarnan of Iceland. They drew the first-leg 2–2 at Fir Park, suffering a 3-2 extra-time defeat in the return leg to suffer elimination from that season's competition.

Overall record

Matches

By competition

By country

Notes

References

External links
Motherwell European Record at Fir Park Corner

Motherwell F.C.
Motherwell